Midleton railway station is a railway station situated in Midleton, a town in south-eastern County Cork, in Ireland.

It is the terminus station on the Cork to Midleton commuter service. Passengers can travel to Glounthaune station to transfer to Cobh.

It has been rebuilt and reopened as a terminus station of the Cork Suburban Railway Line. The station currently has 2 platforms. There is a train operating by the hour from the station.

History
The station originally opened on 10 November 1859 and closed to all traffic in 1988. In 1963 the line was taken out of regular passenger service, from then the line carried daily goods trains, summer excursions and the beet in season. Goods were withdrawn in 1978, however the beet and excursions continued up until 1982. After 1982 the line was infrequently used for railtours, pilgrimages, company days out and finally a GAA special from Midelton in 1988.

In November 2005 the government announced plans for reopening under the Transport 21 initiative. In what was seen as an "election publicity stunt", the station was reopened on 26 May 2009 when Iarnród Éireann brought a special train to the station for a press conference held by a government minister. The press conference was held on board the train, but the train remained stationary. According to an Iarnród Éireann spokesman, "the train wasn't certified to carry passengers."

The line reopened for passenger traffic on 30 July 2009 with new Park and Ride facilities for commuters to Cork City.

See also
 Cork Suburban Rail
 List of railway stations in Ireland
 Metropolitan Cork

References

External links
Irish Rail Midleton Station WEbsite

Iarnród Éireann stations in County Cork
Railway stations in County Cork
Railway stations opened in 1859
Railway stations closed in 1978
Railway stations opened in 2009
Midleton